Hot Video Countdown is an upcoming daily music video series airing on The BWE Television Network. The show is hosted by Josh Skinner (On Air with Ryan Seacrest), actress Brit Sheridan (Kate, Supernatural), actor and model Sam Sarpong and Deja Riley, daughter of music legend Teddy Riley. In addition to music videos, Hot Video Countdown features musicians, actors, and other celebrities promoting their latest work in music, TV and film. Premiering January 1, 2018, performers Tahj Mowry, Tequan Richmond, and Don Benjamin have all announced they'll be on the first week.

References

External links
 
 

2015 American television series debuts
2010s American music television series
American music chart television shows
English-language television shows
Music chart shows